The leka keppe (Sarotherodon lohbergeri) or keppi, is a species of cichlid essentially endemic to Lake Barombi Mbo in western Cameroon, but additionally two juveniles have been found in the Kumba Stream (Kake River), a tributary of the lake's outlet.  This species reaches a length of  SL. It is threatened because of pollution and sedimentation due to human activities. It is potentially also threatened by large emissions of carbon dioxide (CO2) from the lake's bottom (compare Lake Nyos), although studies indicate that Barombo Mbo lacks excess amounts of this gas.

This schooling species feeds on algae, tiny organisms such as rotifers and organic debris.

The specific name honours Karl Lohberger, who is thought to have been Holly's colleague at the Naturhistorisches Staatsmuseum  in Vienna, he  published six papers on fishes in 1929-1930 and then disappeared from the ichthyological record.

References

External links 
 Photograph

Endemic fauna of Cameroon
Sarotherodon
Cichlid fish of Africa
Fish of Lake Barombi Mbo
Taxa named by Maximillian Holly
Fish described in 1930
Taxonomy articles created by Polbot